Church Age is the fourth album by Mr. Del. It was released on March 18, 2003. Perhaps as a play on the traditional Parental Advisory logo that adorns many hip hop albums, the cover of this album features a Parental Advisory-like logo that says Spiritual Advisory Gospel Content [which has led some websites that sell the album to mistakenly label it as having explicit lyrics].

Track listing
 Church Age 
 Hit 'Em 
 Sound da Alarm 
 Pergamos 
 We Here 
 We R' da Church 
 Whactha Workin' Wit? 
 Now We Ready [Featuring Lady Boo]
 Mainline [Remix] 
 Holy Noise 
 Krunk 
 I See Visionz 
 Let My People Go 
 Devil Naw 
 Sleepwalkin' 
 Comm. Break 
 Bounce, Bounce 
 I Got Dat Feelin' 
 Jazzy Bel 
 31 Fava 
 So Real 
 Rapture
 Bonus

References

2003 albums
Mr. Del albums